Heli Syrjä (born 27 November 1967) is a Finnish judoka. She competed in the women's half-heavyweight event at the 1992 Summer Olympics.

References

External links
 

1967 births
Living people
Finnish female judoka
Olympic judoka of Finland
Judoka at the 1992 Summer Olympics
People from Kajaani
Sportspeople from Kainuu